Barrak (Arabic: برّاك) or Al-Barrak (Arabic: البرّاك) is a surname. Notable people with the surname include:

Abdul-Rahman al-Barrak (born c. 1933), senior Saudi cleric
Abdulrahman bin Abdullah Al Barrak (born 1956), Saudi academic
Musallam Al-Barrak, member of the Kuwaiti National Assembly
Nagib Barrak (born 1940), Lebanese alpine skier
Rony Barrak, Lebanese musician and darbouka player and composer
Saad Al Barrak, Kuwaiti businessman and investor

See also

Barack (disambiguation)
Barack Obama, U.S. president
Barak (disambiguation)
Baraq (disambiguation)
Barrack (disambiguation)
Barracks
B-R-K